Maria Pavlovna Titova (born 19 August 1997) is a Russian retired individual rhythmic gymnast. She is the 2013 Grand Prix Final all-around silver medalist

Career

Junior
Titova began to do gymnastics at the age of five when she was noticed by one RG coach on the street and invited to the gym. Later on she was invited by Amina Zaripova to the Center of Olympics in Moscow and this year she began to train in Novogorsk. She won the gold medal in hoop at the 2011 Russian-Chinese Youth Games and placed fifth in all-around at the 2012 Russian Junior Championships in Kazan. Her international junior-level appearances included the 2012 Moscow Grand Prix and the 2012 Deriugina Cup in Kyiv, where she was a member of the gold medal-winning team.

Senior 
In 2013, at the press conference of Grand Prix Moscow, Irina Viner mentioned that she took Titova to the ballet to watch Vrubel's The Swan Princess. Titova used Tchaikovsky's Swan Lake Pas de deux for her hoop routine. On February 9–11, Titova competed in her first senior nationals at the 2013 Russian Championships in Kazan where she finished 5th in all-around. She made her international senior debut at the 2013 Moscow Grand Prix.

Titova made her international breakthrough at the Holon Grand Prix, winning the gold in ribbon. Her first World Cup was the 2013 Irina Deleanu Cup. She finished fourth in all-around and took gold in hoop. Titova won the silver medal in all-around at the 2013 Pesaro World Cup, ahead of teammate Daria Svatkovskaya, and also won silver in the ball final. In September, Vera Shtelbaums became her new coach. Titova finished eighth in the all-around at the 2013 Grand Prix Brno. At the 2013 Grand Prix Final in Berlin. She won the all-around silver ahead of Bulgarian Sylvia Miteva and also took silver in the event finals for ball and hoop.

In 2014, Titova started her season competing at the 2014 Moscow Grand Prix and won silver in the all-around behind Margarita Mamun. In the event finals, she won gold in ribbon and silver in ball. She finished 4th in all-around at the 2014 Thiais Grand Prix and won bronze in ribbon. Titova was assigned to compete at the 2014 Stuttgart World Cup where she won the all-around bronze medal. Titova won another all-around bronze at the 2014 Holon Grand Prix, she qualified to 2 event finals and won bronze in clubs and finished 8th in hoop. Titova finished 6th in all-around at the 2014 Lisboa World Cup, she qualified to 2 event finals winning silver in hoop and finished 6th in ribbon. On April 23–27, Titova competed at the 2014 Russian Championships and finished 4th in all-around behind Aleksandra Soldatova. Her next event, Titova competed at the 2014 Desio Italia Cup with teammates Margarita Mamun and Yana Kudryavtseva where she won the all-around silver medal. On May 30 – June 1, Titova finished 4th in all-around at the 2014 Minsk World Cup, she qualified to 1 event final finishing 6th in hoop. On July 4–6, Titova competed at the Izmir Tournament Cup and won the all-around silver medal behind teammate Aleksandra Soldatova, In event finals, Titova won 2 gold (hoop, ball) and bronze in clubs. On August 8–10, Titova competed at the 2014 Sofia World Cup finishing 5th in all-around with a total of 69.300 points behind Melitina Staniouta, she qualified to 2 event finals taking bronze in ribbon and 6th in hoop. On September 5–7, at the 2014 World Cup Final in Kazan, Russia, Ttiova she finished 22nd in all-around after 2 drops from her hoop and clubs routine and mistakes in ribbon, thus because of her unstable results, Irina Viner decided to remove Titova from Russia's team to compete in the 2014 World Championships, On October 18–20, Titova returned to competition at the 2014 Grand Prix Berlin where she won the all-around gold, In event finals she won gold in hoop, ball and ribbon and finished 8th in clubs. She finished 4th in all-around at the 2014 Grand Prix Brno behind Victoria Veinberg Filanovsky. Titova suffered a minor leg injury and withdrew from the 2014 Grand Prix Final in Innsbruck.

At the beginning of 2015, Titova was assigned to her new coach Marina Govorova. Her first competition this year was the Moscow Championships. Her next event was the MTM International Tournament in Slovenia where she won the all-around gold, ahead of her teammate Yulia Sinitsina. In the event finals, she won gold in ball and silvers in hoop, clubs and ribbon. Her third competition this year was the Russian Championships in Penza where she ranked 8th in the all around. In the apparatus finals, she was 8th in ribbon. Her fourth competition this year was the International tournament in Holon. She won gold in ball. Her fifth competition this year was the 2015 Summer Universiade in Gwangju, Korea where Titova finished 4th in the all-around behind Melitina Staniouta of Belarus. She qualified to 3 apparatus finals taking silver in hoop, bronze in ball and finished 4th in ribbon. In August, Titova competed at the MTK Budapest Cup and won the all-around silver medal behind Dina Averina. In event finals, she won gold in ribbon and silver in clubs. At the International Tournament Sofia Cup 2015, Titova suffered another injury (knee) and withdrew from the competition after two routines. In November, she returned to competition at the Italian international friendly invitational club the Italia Serie A.

In 2016 Season, Titova was relegated to the Russian National reserve team, she switched coaching and began training under Daria Kondakova. She competed in an internal Russian event at the 2016 Yaroslavl Spring. Titova then competed at the 2016 Russian Championships finishing 13th in the all-around. She completed her career at the end of the season.

Personal life 
Titova is an only child. Her favorite gymnast is Irina Tchachina.

Routine music information

References

External links
 
 
 Maria Titova The Swan
 

1997 births
Living people
Russian rhythmic gymnasts
Universiade medalists in gymnastics
Sportspeople from Penza
Universiade silver medalists for Russia
Universiade bronze medalists for Russia
Medalists at the 2015 Summer Universiade